Phillip Charles Trautwein (born April 16, 1986) is a former American football offensive tackle who is the current offensive line coach for the Penn State Nittany Lions. Trautwein played college football for the University of Florida, and was a member of two BCS National Championship teams.  He also played professionally for the St. Louis Rams, and was a member of practice squads of the Cleveland Browns and New Orleans Saints.

Early years
Trautwein was born and raised in Voorhees Township, New Jersey.  He attended Eastern Regional High School in Voorhees Township, and he played for the Eastern Vikings high school football team.  Trautwein earned second-team all-conference football honors following his junior season.  He also excelled in wrestling, and graduated with a 3.7 gradepoint average in 2004.

College career
Trautwein accepted an athletic scholarship to attend the University of Florida in Gainesville, Florida, where he played for coach Ron Zook and coach Urban Meyer's Florida Gators football teams from 2004 to 2008.  As a freshman in 2004, Trautwein was a reserve offensive tackle seeing action in six games.  The next season, 2005, he played in all twelve games, making his first career start as a tight end against Florida State.  Following the 2006, he was named to the Southeastern Conference (SEC) Fall Academic Honor Roll and received second-team All-SEC honors after starting all fourteen games for the Gators at left tackle.  He sat out the 2007 season with a stress fracture in his foot.  As a senior in 2008, he started all twelve games at left tackle and was a first-team All-SEC selection at tackle for the second time in two years; both seasons he was All-SEC, the Gators were the consensus BCS Champions.  Trautwein graduated from Florida with a bachelor's degree in 2007 and a master's degree in 2008.

Professional career

Pre-draft

St. Louis Rams
On April 27, 2009, Trautwein was signed by the St. Louis Rams as an undrafted free agent. On June 12, 2009 Trautwein's younger sister, Sarah, died in a car accident. On August 5, 2009 Trautwein was waived by the St. Louis Rams.

Cleveland Browns
On August 6, 2009 Trautwein was claimed off of waivers by the Cleveland Browns. On October 7, 2009 Trautwein was waived by the Cleveland Browns.

St. Louis Rams
The Rams signed Trautwein to their 53-man roster in October 2009 after being waived by the Browns. On September 5, 2011, he was released with an injury settlement.

New Orleans Saints
The Saints signed Trautwein to their practice squad on November 23, 2011. Phil Trautwein was re-signed on January 18, 2012.

San Diego Chargers
On May 29, 2012, Trautwein was signed by the San Diego Chargers. On August 27, 2012, he was released by the Chargers.

See also

 List of University of Florida alumni
 List of St. Louis Rams players

References

Bibliography
 Carlson, Norm, University of Florida Football Vault: The History of the Florida Gators, Whitman Publishing, LLC, Atlanta, Georgia (2007).  .

External links 
 Phil Trautwein – Florida Gators profile
 Phil Trautwein – New Orleans Saints 
 Phil Trautwein - Penn State Nittany Lions Profile

1986 births
Living people
Eastern Regional High School alumni
People from Voorhees Township, New Jersey
American football offensive tackles
Florida Gators football players
St. Louis Rams players
Cleveland Browns players
Sportspeople from Camden County, New Jersey
Players of American football from New Jersey
Boston College Eagles football coaches
Davidson Wildcats football coaches
Penn State Nittany Lions football coaches